Simona Poustilnik is a Russian biologist, philosopher, historian of science,  and is also a science journalist. She has a PhD in the history of Russian science from the Institute for the History of Science and Technology, Moscow, Russian Academy of Sciences. Her major research is in the area of the history of Russian science, particularly of system theory, Bogdanov's tectology, and Russian cosmism. She lives and works in London. She is a member of the British Society for the History of Science and the Authors and Publicists International Association.

Research interests 
Her main research interests are on the history of 20th-century Russian science and philosophy (particularly, systems theory, evolutionary theory and Bolshevistic science). Her special interest is Bogdanov's Tektology, Russian Darwinism and development of proletarian science during the first postrevolutionary  decades. Now she is working on an international project, exploring interactions among science, and filmmaking in Bolshevik Russia, focusing on the relationships between system thinking in Russia and Soviet Constructivism.

In her research she is connecting the understanding of the Russian Darwinists of “natural podbor” as ‘fine-tuning’ by nature and Bogdanov’s concept of tektological ‘podbor’ (‘assembling’) as the universal mechanism of the construction of any organization.

As Simona Poustlinik commented at a recent conference on Bogdanov:
It is remarkable the extent to which Bogdanov anticipated the ideas
which were to be developed in systems thinking later in the twentieth
century. He anticipated not only a general theory of systems and
cybernetics, but also ideas which entered into systems science in the
late decades and which are associated with the names of Prigogine,
Jantsch and Maturana.

Selected publications 
Approximately sixty papers and monographs have been published, The following represent a selection of papers published in English and Russian:
 “Bogdanov’s Tektology: A Science of Construction” (2016) in Early Soviet Thought: Bogdanov, Eisenstein and the Proletkult, Spherical Book I. Tangential Points Publication Series. Editor-in-Chief: Pia Tikka; Editorial Board: John Biggart, Vesa Oittinen, Giulia Rispoli, Maja Soboleva. Helsinki, Espoo: Aalto University. 
"Индейский матриархат (Indian Matiarchy), (2004) article about Iroquois gender relations published in Nezavisimaya gazeta
 Poustilnik,  S.  Tectology in the Context of Intellectual Thought in Russia (Alexandr Bogdanov Revisited, University of Helsinki, Aleksanteri Series, 1/2009, pp. 105–137). 
 Poustilnik, S.   Alexander Bogdanov and the Genesis of the Systems Theory ( Alexander Bogdanov, Specimina Philologiae Slavicae, University of Marburg, Munchen, 2008, pp. 116–140).                    
 Poustilnik,  S.. The vegetable of Proletarian Revolution (in Russian). In Nesavisimaja gaseta, 2004, N 10.
 Poustilnik,  S..  The role of gender in evolution of the man. (in Russian). In Nesavisimaja gaseta, 2004, N 09.
 Poustilnik,  S..  Hamlet from Red Star (in Russian)/ In Nesavisimaja gaseta, 2002. N 12
 Poustilnik, S. Biological Ideas in Tektology and Discussion Papers. In Alexander Bogdanov and the Origins of Systems Thinking in Russia. 1998. pp. 63–73, 112-116, 127-128, 216-217, 313, 314., 1998,  Ashgate, UK.
 Poustilnik, S. (and Dudley P.)  Modern Systems Science: Variations on a Theme? Center for Systems Studies, Research Memorandum, 1996, No 11, 20 p., Hull, UK
 Poustilnik, S. (and Dudley P.) Reading the Tektology: Provisional Findings, Postulates and Research Directions, Center for Systems Studies, Research Memorandum, 1995,  N 7, 20 p., Hull, UK
 Poustilnik,S. Bogdanov's Tektology: Between Science and Philosophy. In Filosofskie issledovanija, Moscow,  1995, N 3, pp. 226–241
 Poustilnik, S. Principle  of Assemblage as Base of A. Bogdanov's Concept) In Voprosy filosofii, Moscow, 1995, N 8, pp. 24–30
 Poustilnik, S.  The Ideas of  Evolution in A. Bogdanov's Tektology. In The Concept of Self-Organization in a Historical Perspective, 1994, Moscow, Nauka, pp. 189–198
 Poustilnik, S.  Ivan Pavlov. //Science in the USSR, 1987. N 3, pp. 100–107.
 Poustilnik, S. Returned life.  In Science in the USSR, 1988. N 5, pp. 40–43.
 Poustilnik, S. Evolution of Immunity.  In Science in the USSR, 1989. N 2, pp. 127–128.

External links

 Some rare Bogdanov photos courtesy of Simona Poustilnik
Red Hamlet
The Science for the better world
Sex in Human Evolution
Vavilov and Food of the future
Avoska from Prince Charles
Pure English doctrine
Heretic of Medicine
Why Alice asks too clever questions
Origin of Gender
Ethology Persons
Organizational Dynamics
Tectology
Alexander Bogdanov and the Origins of Systems Thinking in Russia 
Centre for Systems Studies of University of Hull
Когда человечество, кончив блуждания…
Наука для лучшего мира
Человечества сны золотые
Какие яблони будут цвести на Марсе
Умолчание об авариях часто оправдывали секретностью
Aleksandr Bogdanov’s Tektology: A Proletarian Science of Construction

References

Historians of science
Systems biologists
Systems scientists
Russian journalists
1961 births
Living people
Women systems scientists
Russian biologists